Markus Miller (born 8 April 1982) is a German former professional footballer who played as a goalkeeper.

Career
Born in Lindenberg im Allgäu, Miller started to play football at local amateur side FC Lindenberg and moved later to FC Wangen, another regional amateur side.

In 2000, Miller moved to Bundesliga side VfB Stuttgart, although he generally played for their reserve squad in the third-division Regionalliga Süd, where he made a total of 44 appearances for the team over the following two seasons. He only occasionally sat on the bench for Stuttgart's professional squad in the Bundesliga, making no first-division appearances throughout the two seasons with the club. He went on to make a move to then Regionalliga Süd side FC Augsburg for the 2002–03 season, subsequently making a total of 18 league appearances throughout the season.

In the summer of 2003, Miller made a move to 2. Bundesliga side Karlsruher SC, but failed to make a single first-team appearance in his first season with the club. However, he became the club's first-choice goalkeeper for the 2004–05 season and made his professional debut on 7 August 2004 in KSC's 1–1 home draw to Wacker Burghausen in the 2. Bundesliga. He went on to make 30 appearances in the league that season, and the following season, he played in all 34 2. Bundesliga matches for KSC.

Miller continued to be KSC's first-choice goalkeeper in the 2006–07 season of the 2. Bundesliga, missing only four matches. On 9 October 2006, he extended his contract with KSC until 30 June 2009.

Miller is often compared to KSC's goalkeeping legend Oliver Kahn, who played for the club from his childhood until the 1994 transfer to Bayern Munich, but does not feel comfortable with the comparison. The fans nicknamed him Killer Miller after a sensational DFB-Pokal performance against Mainz 05 on 21 September 2004, when he saved all three penalty attempts from the Mainz side during the penalty shootout. Another of his high-quality performances for KSC came on 16 October 2006 in away derby at 1. FC Köln in the 2. Bundesliga, where he amazingly saved several close-range shots in the second half and helped KSC to drive home one point as the match ended in a 1–1 draw.

On 6 November 2006, Miller was voted best goalkeeper in the whole Bundesliga system by users of the official Bundesliga website.

On 24 October 2008, Miller extended his contract with KSC for another year until 30 June 2010. On 6 May 2010, he confirmed that would leave Karlsruher SC after seven years at end of the season, and on 2 June 2010, he signed a two-year contract for Hannover 96.

Honours
VfB Stuttgart
 UEFA Intertoto Cup: 2000

References

External links

 
 

Living people
1982 births
People from Lindenberg im Allgäu
Sportspeople from Swabia (Bavaria)
German footballers
Footballers from Bavaria
Association football goalkeepers
VfB Stuttgart II players
FC Augsburg players
Karlsruher SC players
Hannover 96 players
Bundesliga players
2. Bundesliga players